The Costa Book Award for Novel, formerly known as the Whitbread Award (1971-2006), was an annual literary award for novels, as part of the Costa Book Awards. 

The awards were dissolved in 2022.

Recipients 
Costa Books of the Year are distinguished with a blue ribbon. Award winners are listed in bold.

See also 

 Costa Book Award for Biography
 Costa Book Award for Children's Books
 Costa Book Award for First Novel
 Costa Book Award for Poetry
 Costa Book Award for Short Story
 Costa Book Awards

References

External links 

 Official website

Fiction awards
Awards established in 1971
Costa Book Awards